This is a list of ASTM international standards with ID in the range D6001–7000.

List

D6001–6100
 D6001/D6001M – 20 Guide for Direct-Push Groundwater Sampling for Environmental Site Characterization
 D6004 – 20 Test Method for Determining Adhesive Shear Strength of Resilient Flooring and Carpet Adhesives
 D6006 – 17 Guide for Assessing Biodegradability of Hydraulic Fluids
 D6007 – 14 Test Method for Determining Formaldehyde Concentrations in Air from Wood Products Using a Small-Scale Chamber
 D6008 – 96(2014) Practice for Conducting Environmental Baseline Surveys
 D6009 – 19 Guide for Sampling Waste Piles
 D6011 – 96(2015) Test Method for Determining the Performance of a Sonic Anemometer/Thermometer
 D6012 – 03(2013) Test Method for Determination of Resistance of Leather to (Bleeding) Color Stain Transfer
 D6013 – 00(2018) Test Method for Determination of Area Stability of Leather to Laundering
 D6014 – 00(2015) Test Method for Determination of Dynamic Water Absorption of Leather Surfaces
 D6015 – 14 Test Method for Static Water Absorption of Leather
 D6016 – 17 Test Method for Determination of Nitrogen, Water Extractable in Leather
 D6017 – 97(2020)e1 Test Method for Determination of Magnesium Sulfate (Epsom Salt) in Leather
 D6019 – 20 Test Method for Determination of Chromic Oxide in Basic Chromium Tanning Liquors (Ammonium Persulfate Oxidation)
 D6020 – 00(2020) Practice for Calculation of (Non-Mineral) Combined Tanning Agents and Degree of Tannage
 D6021 – 12(2017) Test Method for Measurement of Total Hydrogen Sulfide in Residual Fuels by Multiple Headspace Extraction and Sulfur Specific Detection
 D6022 – 19 Practice for Calculation of Permanent Shear Stability Index
 D6023 – 16 Test Method for Density (Unit Weight), Yield, Cement Content, and Air Content (Gravimetric) of Controlled Low-Strength Material (CLSM)
 D6024/D6024M – 16 Test Method for Ball Drop on Controlled Low Strength Material (CLSM) to Determine Suitability for Load Application
 D6026 – 13 Practice for Using Significant Digits in Geotechnical Data
 D6027/D6027M – 15 Practice for Calibrating Linear Displacement Transducers for Geotechnical Purposes
 D6028/D6028M – 20 Practice for (Analytical Procedure) Determining Hydraulic Properties of a Confined Aquifer Taking into Consideration Storage of Water in Leaky Confining Beds by Modified Hantush Method
 D6029/D6029M – 20 Practice for (Analytical Procedures) Determining Hydraulic Properties of a Confined Aquifer and a Leaky Confining Bed with Negligible Storage by the Hantush-Jacob Method
 D6030 – 15 Guide for Selection of Methods for Assessing Groundwater or Aquifer Sensitivity and Vulnerability
 D6031/D6031M – 96(2015) Test Method for Logging In Situ Moisture Content and Density of Soil and Rock by the Nuclear Method in Horizontal, Slanted, and Vertical Access Tubes
 D6032/D6032M – 17 Test Method for Determining Rock Quality Designation (RQD) of Rock Core
 D6033 – 16 Guide for Describing the Functionality of a Groundwater Modeling Code
 D6034 – 20 Practice for (Analytical Procedure) Determining the Efficiency of a Production Well in a Confined Aquifer from a Constant Rate Pumping Test
 D6035/D6035M – 19 Test Methods for Determining the Effect of Freeze-Thaw on Hydraulic Conductivity of Compacted or Intact Soil Specimens Using a Flexible Wall Permeameter
 D6036 – 96(2014) Guide for Displaying the Results of Chemical Analyses of Groundwater for Major Ions and Trace Elements—Use of Maps
 D6037 – 18 Test Methods for Dry Abrasion Mar Resistance of High Gloss Coatings
 D6038 – 14 Test Methods for Determining the Compatibility of Resin/Solvent Mixtures by Precipitation Temperature (Cloud Point)
 D6039/D6039M – 18 Specification for Open and Covered Wood Crates
 D6040 – 18 Guide to Standard Test Methods for Unsintered Polytetrafluoroethylene (PTFE) Extruded Film or Tape
 D6041 – 18 Specification for Contact-Molded “Fiberglass” (Glass-Fiber-Reinforced Thermosetting Resin) Corrosion Resistant Pipe and Fittings
 D6042 – 09(2016) Test Method for Determination of Phenolic Antioxidants and Erucamide Slip Additives in Polypropylene Homopolymer Formulations Using Liquid Chromatography (LC)
 D6044 – 96(2015) Guide for Representative Sampling for Management of Waste and Contaminated Media
 D6045 – 20 Test Method for Color of Petroleum Products by the Automatic Tristimulus Method
 D6046 – 18 Classification of Hydraulic Fluids for Environmental Impact
 D6047 – 17 Test Methods for Rubber, Raw—Determination of 5-Ethylidenenorbornene (ENB) or Dicyclopentadiene (DCPD) in Ethylene-Propylene-Diene (EPDM) Terpolymers
 D6048 – 07(2018) Practice for Stress Relaxation Testing of Raw Rubber, Unvulcanized Rubber Compounds, and Thermoplastic Elastomers
 D6049 – 03(2017) Test Method for Rubber Property—Measurement of the Viscous and Elastic Behavior of Unvulcanized Raw Rubbers and Rubber Compounds by Compression Between Parallel Plates
 D6050 – 09(2016) Test Method for Determination of Insoluble Solids in Organic Liquid Hazardous Waste
 D6051 – 15 Guide for Composite Sampling and Field Subsampling for Environmental Waste Management Activities
 D6052 – 97(2016) Test Method for Preparation and Elemental Analysis of Liquid Hazardous Waste by Energy-Dispersive X-Ray Fluorescence
 D6053 – 14(2018) Test Method for Determination of Volatile Organic Compound (VOC) Content of Electrical Insulating Varnishes
 D6055 – 96(2019) Test Methods for Mechanical Handling of Unitized Loads and Large Shipping Cases and Crates
 D6058 – 96(2016) Practice for Determining Concentration of Airborne Single-Crystal Ceramic Whiskers in the Workplace Environment
 D6060 – 17 Test Method for Sampling of Process Vents with a Portable Gas Chromatograph
 D6061 – 01(2018)e1 Practice for Evaluating the Performance of Respirable Aerosol Samplers
 D6062 – 19 Guide for Personal Samplers of Health-Related Aerosol Fractions
 D6063 – 11(2018) Guide for Sampling of Drums and Similar Containers by Field Personnel
 D6064 – 11(2015) Specification for HFC-227ea, 1,1,1,2,3,3,3-Heptafluoropropane (CF3CHFCF3)
 D6065 – 11(2015) Practice for Handling, Transportation, and Storage of HFC-227ea 1,1,1,2,3,3,3-Heptafluoropropane (CF3CHFCF3)
 D6067/D6067M – 17 Practice for Using the Electronic Piezocone Penetrometer Tests for Environmental Site Characterization and Estimation of Hydraulic Conductivity
 D6068 – 10(2018) Test Method for Determining J-R Curves of Plastic Materials
 D6071 – 14 Test Method for Low Level Sodium in High Purity Water by Graphite Furnace Atomic Absorption Spectroscopy
 D6072/D6072M – 19 Practice for Obtaining Samples of Geosynthetic Clay Liners
 D6073 – 08a(2020) Test Method for Relative Setting of Heatset Printing Inks
 D6074 – 15 Guide for Characterizing Hydrocarbon Lubricant Base Oils
 D6075 – 13(2020) Test Method for Cracking Resistance of Leather
 D6076 – 18 Test Method for Shrinkage Temperature of Leather
 D6077 – 16 Test Method for Trapezoid Tearing Strength of Leather
 D6078 – 04(2016) Test Method for Evaluating Lubricity of Diesel Fuels by the Scuffing Load Ball-on-Cylinder Lubricity Evaluator (SLBOCLE)
 D6079 – 18 Test Method for Evaluating Lubricity of Diesel Fuels by the High-Frequency Reciprocating Rig (HFRR)
 D6080 – 18a Practice for Defining the Viscosity Characteristics of Hydraulic Fluids
 D6081 – 20 Practice for Aquatic Toxicity Testing of Lubricants: Sample Preparation and Results Interpretation
 D6082 – 12(2017) Test Method for High Temperature Foaming Characteristics of Lubricating Oils
 D6083/D6083M – 18 Specification for Liquid Applied Acrylic Coating Used in Roofing
 D6084/D6084M – 18 Test Method for Elastic Recovery of Asphalt Materials by Ductilometer
 D6085 – 97(2016) Practice for Sampling in Rubber Testing—Terminology and Basic Concepts
 D6087 – 08(2015)e1 Test Method for Evaluating Asphalt-Covered Concrete Bridge Decks Using Ground Penetrating Radar
 D6088 – 06(2016) Practice for Installation of Geocomposite Pavement Drains
 D6089 – 19 Guide for Documenting a Groundwater Sampling Event
 D6090 – 17 Test Method for Softening Point Resins (Mettler Cup and Ball Method)
 D6091 – 07(2014) Practice for 99%/95 % Interlaboratory Detection Estimate (IDE) for Analytical Methods with Negligible Calibration Error
 D6092 – 14e1 Practice for Specifying Standard Sizes of Stone for Erosion Control
 D6093 – 97(2016) Test Method for Percent Volume Nonvolatile Matter in Clear or Pigmented Coatings Using a Helium Gas Pycnometer
 D6095 – 12(2018) Test Method for Longitudinal Measurement of Volume Resistivity for Extruded Crosslinked and Thermoplastic Semiconducting Conductor and Insulation Shielding Materials
 D6096 – 11(2016) Specification for Poly(Vinyl Chloride) Insulation for Wire and Cable, 90 °C Operation
 D6097 – 16 Test Method for Relative Resistance to Vented Water-Tree Growth in Solid Dielectric Insulating Materials
 D6098 – 16 Classification System and Basis for Specification for Extruded and Compression Molded Shapes Made from Polycarbonate (PC)
 D6099 – 18 Test Method for Polyurethane Raw Materials: Determination of Acidity in Moderate to High Acidity Aromatic Isocyanates
 D6100 – 17 Specification for Extruded, Compression Molded and Injection Molded Polyoxymethylene Shapes (POM)

D6101–6200
 D6102 – 20 Guide for Installation of Geosynthetic Clay Liners
 D6103/D6103M – 17 Test Method for Flow Consistency of Controlled Low Strength Material (CLSM)
 D6104 – 97(2017)e1 Practice for Determining the Performance of Oil/Water Separators Subjected to Surface Run-Off
 D6105 – 04(2019) Practice for Application of Electrical Discharge Surface Treatment (Activation) of Plastics for Adhesive Bonding
 D6107 – 97(2017) Specification for Stop-Leak Additive for Engine Coolants Used in Light Duty Service
 D6108 – 19 Test Method for Compressive Properties of Plastic Lumber and Shapes
 D6109 – 19 Test Methods for Flexural Properties of Unreinforced and Reinforced Plastic Lumber and Related Products
 D6110 – 18 Test Method for Determining the Charpy Impact Resistance of Notched Specimens of Plastics
 D6111 – 19a Test Method for Bulk Density And Specific Gravity of Plastic Lumber and Shapes by Displacement
 D6112 – 18 Test Methods for Compressive and Flexural Creep and Creep-Rupture of Plastic Lumber and Shapes
 D6113 – 16 Test Method for Using a Cone Calorimeter to Determine Fire-Test-Response Characteristics of Insulating Materials Contained in Electrical or Optical Fiber Cables
 D6114/D6114M – 19 Specification for Asphalt-Rubber Binder
 D6115 – 97(2019) Test Method for Mode I Fatigue Delamination Growth Onset of Unidirectional Fiber-Reinforced Polymer Matrix Composites
 D6116 – 18 Test Method for Blocking
 D6117 – 18 Test Methods for Mechanical Fasteners in Plastic Lumber and Shapes
 D6119 – 19 Practice for Creating Surface Appearance Changes in Pile Yarn Floor Covering from Foot Traffic
 D6120 – 97(2017)e1 Test Method for Electrical Resistivity of Anode and Cathode Carbon Material at Room Temperature
 D6121 – 19a Test Method for Evaluation of Load-Carrying Capacity of Lubricants Under Conditions of Low Speed and High Torque Used for Final Hypoid Drive Axles
 D6122 – 20a Practice for Validation of the Performance of Multivariate Online, At-Line, Field and Laboratory Infrared Spectrophotometer, and Raman Spectrometer Based Analyzer Systems
 D6123/D6123M – 97(2020) Specification for Pressure-Sensitive Tape for Light-Duty Packaging and General Purpose Masking
 D6124 – 06(2017) Test Method for Residual Powder on Medical Gloves
 D6126/D6126M – 11(2015) Specification for HFC-23 (Trifluoromethane, CHF3)
 D6127 – 11(2015) Practice for Handling, Transportation, and Storage of HFC-23 (Trifluoromethane, CHF3)
 D6128 – 16 Test Method for Shear Testing of Bulk Solids Using the Jenike Shear Tester
 D6129 – 97(2015) Test Method for Silicon in Engine Coolant Concentrates by Atomic Absorption Spectroscopy
 D6130 – 11(2018) Test Method for Determination of Silicon and Other Elements in Engine Coolant by Inductively Coupled Plasma-Atomic Emission Spectroscopy
 D6131 – 17 Test Method for Evaluating the Relative Tint Undertone of Titanium Dioxide Pigments
 D6132 – 13(2017) Test Method for Nondestructive Measurement of Dry Film Thickness of Applied Organic Coatings Using an Ultrasonic Coating Thickness Gage
 D6133 – 02(2014) Test Method for Acetone, p-Chlorobenzotrifluoride, Methyl Acetate or t-Butyl Acetate Content of Solventborne and Waterborne Paints, Coatings, Resins, and Raw Materials by Direct Injection Into a Gas Chromatograph
 D6134/D6134M – 07(2019)e1 Specification for Vulcanized Rubber Sheets Used in Waterproofing Systems
 D6136/D6136M – 15 Test Method for Kerosine Number of Unsaturated (Dry) Felt by Vacuum Method
 D6137 – 97(2018) Test Method for Sulfuric Acid Resistance of Polymer Linings for Flue Gas Desulfurization Systems
 D6138 – 19 Test Method for Determination of Corrosion-Preventive Properties of Lubricating Greases Under Dynamic Wet Conditions (Emcor Test)
 D6139 – 18 Test Method for Determining the Aerobic Aquatic Biodegradation of Lubricants or Their Components Using the Gledhill Shake Flask
 D6140 – 00(2014) Test Method to Determine Asphalt Retention of Paving Fabrics Used in Asphalt Paving for Full-Width Applications
 D6141 – 18 Guide for Screening Clay Portion and Index Flux of Geosynthetic Clay Liner (GCL) for Chemical Compatibility to Liquids
 D6142 – 16 Test Method for Analysis of Phenol by Capillary Gas Chromatography
 D6143 – 18 Test Method for Iron Content of Bisphenol A (4,4′ – Isopropylidenediphenol)
 D6144 – 17 Test Method for Analysis of AMS (α-Methylstyrene) by Capillary Gas Chromatography
 D6145 – 97(2018) Guide for Monitoring Sediment in Watersheds
 D6146 – 97(2018) Guide for Monitoring Aqueous Nutrients in Watersheds
 D6147 – 97(2020) Test Method for Vulcanized Rubber and Thermoplastic Elastomer—Determination of Force Decay (Stress Relaxation) in Compression
 D6150 – 16 Test Method for Estimating Processing Losses of Plastisols and Organosols Due to Volatility
 D6151/D6151M – 15 Practice for Using Hollow-Stem Augers for Geotechnical Exploration and Soil Sampling
 D6152/D6152M – 12(2018) Specification for SEBS-Modified Mopping Asphalt Used in Roofing
 D6153 – 15 Specification for Materials for Bridge Deck Waterproofing Membrane Systems
 D6154 – 15 Specification for Chemically Modified Asphalt Cement for Use in Pavement Construction
 D6155 – 19 Specification for Nontraditional Coarse Aggregates for Asphalt Paving Mixtures
 D6157 – 97(2017)e1 Practice for Determining the Performance of Oil/Water Separators Subjected to a Sudden Release
 D6158 – 18 Specification for Mineral Hydraulic Oils
 D6159 – 17 Test Method for Determination of Hydrocarbon Impurities in Ethylene by Gas Chromatography
 D6160 – 98(2017) Test Method for Determination of Polychlorinated Biphenyls (PCBs) in Waste Materials by Gas Chromatography
 D6161 – 19 Terminology Used for Microfiltration, Ultrafiltration, Nanofiltration, and Reverse Osmosis Membrane Processes
 D6162/D6162M – 16 Specification for Styrene Butadiene Styrene (SBS) Modified Bituminous Sheet Materials Using a Combination of Polyester and Glass Fiber Reinforcements
 D6163/D6163M – 16 Specification for Styrene Butadiene Styrene (SBS) Modified Bituminous Sheet Materials Using Glass Fiber Reinforcements
 D6164/D6164M – 16 Specification for Styrene Butadiene Styrene (SBS) Modified Bituminous Sheet Materials Using Polyester Reinforcements
 D6166 – 12(2016) Test Method for Color of Pine Chemicals and Related Products (Instrumental Determination of Gardner Color)
 D6167 – 19 Guide for Conducting Borehole Geophysical Logging: Mechanical Caliper
 D6169/D6169M – 13 Guide for Selection of Soil and Rock Sampling Devices Used With Drill Rigs for Environmental Investigations
 D6170 – 17 Guide for Selecting a Groundwater Modeling Code
 D6172/D6172M – 18 Test Method for Determining the Volume of Bulk Materials Using Contours or Cross Sections Created by Direct Operator Compilation Using Photogrammetric Procedures
 D6173 – 97(2014) Test Method for Determination of Various Anionic Surfactant Actives by Potentiometric Titration
 D6175 – 03(2019) Test Method for Radial Crush Strength of Extruded Catalyst and Catalyst Carrier Particles
 D6176 – 97(2015) Practice for Measuring Surface Atmospheric Temperature with Electrical Resistance Temperature Sensors
 D6177 – 19 Practice for Determining Emission Profiles of Volatile Organic Chemicals Emitted from Bedding Sets
 D6178 – 19 Practice for Estimation of Short-Term Inhalation Exposure to Volatile Organic Chemicals Emitted from Bedding Sets
 D6179 – 20 Test Methods for Rough Handling of Unitized Loads and Large Shipping Cases and Crates
 D6182 – 00(2015) Test Method for Flexibility and Adhesion of Finish on Leather
 D6183 – 00(2015) Test Method for Tackiness of Finish on Leather
 D6184 – 17 Test Method for Oil Separation from Lubricating Grease (Conical Sieve Method)
 D6185 – 11(2017) Practice for Evaluating Compatibility of Binary Mixtures of Lubricating Greases
 D6186 – 19 Test Method for Oxidation Induction Time of Lubricating Oils by Pressure Differential Scanning Calorimetry (PDSC)
 D6188 – 17 Test Method for Viscosity of Cellulose by Cuprammonium Ball Fall
 D6189 – 97(2014) Practice for Evaluating the Efficiency of Chemical Removers for Organic Coatings
 D6191 – 97(2014) Test Method for Measurement of Evolved Formaldehyde from Water Reducible Air-Dry Coatings
 D6192/D6192M – 19 Tables of Body Measurements for Girls, Sizes 2 to 20 (Reg & Slim) and Girls Plus
 D6193 – 16(2020) Practice for Stitches and Seams
 D6194 – 18 Test Method for Glow-Wire Ignition of Materials
 D6195 – 03(2019) Test Methods for Loop Tack
 D6196 – 15e1 Practice for Choosing Sorbents, Sampling Parameters and Thermal Desorption Analytical Conditions for Monitoring Volatile Organic Chemicals in Air
 D6197 – 99(2017) Test Method for Classifying and Counting Faults in Spun Yarns in Electronic Tests
 D6198 – 18 Guide for Transport Packaging Design
 D6199 – 18a Practice for Quality of Wood Members of Containers and Pallets
 D6200 – 01(2017) Test Method for Determination of Cooling Characteristics of Quench Oils by Cooling Curve Analysis

D6201-6300
 D6201 – 19a Test Method for Dynamometer Evaluation of Unleaded Spark-Ignition Engine Fuel for Intake Valve Deposit Formation
 D6203 – 17 Test Method for Thermal Stability of Way Lubricants
 D6204 – 19a Test Method for Rubber—Measurement of Unvulcanized Rheological Properties Using Rotorless Shear Rheometers
 D6205 – 20 Practice for Calibration of the James Static Coefficient of Friction Machine
 D6206 – 09(2015) Practice for Sampling of Coating Films
 D6207 – 03(2019) Test Method for Dimensional Stability of Fabrics to Changes in Humidity and Temperature
 D6208 – 07(2020) Test Method for Repassivation Potential of Aluminum and Its Alloys by Galvanostatic Measurement
 D6209 – 13 Test Method for Determination of Gaseous and Particulate Polycyclic Aromatic Hydrocarbons in Ambient Air (Collection on Sorbent-Backed Filters with Gas Chromatographic/Mass Spectrometric Analysis)
 D6210 – 17 Specification for Fully-Formulated Glycol Base Engine Coolant for Heavy-Duty Engines
 D6213 – 17 Practice for Tests to Evaluate the Chemical Resistance of Geogrids to Liquids
 D6214/D6214M – 98(2013)e1 Test Method for Determining the Integrity of Field Seams Used in Joining Geomembranes by Chemical Fusion Methods
 D6216 – 20 Practice for Opacity Monitor Manufacturers to Certify Conformance with Design and Performance Specifications
 D6217 – 18 Test Method for Particulate Contamination in Middle Distillate Fuels by Laboratory Filtration
 D6221/D6221M – 00(2014)e1 Specification for Reinforced Bituminous Flashing Sheets for Roofing and Waterproofing
 D6222/D6222M – 16 Specification for Atactic Polypropylene (APP) Modified Bituminous Sheet Materials Using Polyester Reinforcements
 D6223/D6223M – 16 Specification for Atactic Polypropylene (APP) Modified Bituminous Sheet Materials Using a Combination of Polyester and Glass Fiber Reinforcements
 D6224 – 16 Practice for In-Service Monitoring of Lubricating Oil for Auxiliary Power Plant Equipment
 D6225/D6225M – 98(2020) Test Method for Granule Cover of Mineral-Surfaced Roofing
 D6226 – 15 Test Method for Open Cell Content of Rigid Cellular Plastics
 D6227 – 18 Specification for Unleaded Aviation Gasoline Containing a Non-hydrocarbon Component
 D6228 – 19 Test Method for Determination of Sulfur Compounds in Natural Gas and Gaseous Fuels by Gas Chromatography and Flame Photometric Detection
 D6229 – 06(2018) Test Method for Trace Benzene in Hydrocarbon Solvents by Capillary Gas Chromatography
 D6230 – 13 Test Method for Monitoring Ground Movement Using Probe-Type Inclinometers
 D6231 – 11(2015) Specification for HFC-125 (Pentafluoroethane, C2HF5)
 D6232 – 16 Guide for Selection of Sampling Equipment for Waste and Contaminated Media Data Collection Activities
 D6234 – 13(2020) Test Method for Shake Extraction of Mining Waste by the Synthetic Precipitation Leaching Procedure
 D6235 – 18 Practice for Expedited Site Characterization of Vadose Zone and Groundwater Contamination at Hazardous Waste Contaminated Sites
 D6237 – 19 Guide for Painting Inspectors (Concrete and Masonry Substrates)
 D6238 – 98(2017) Test Method for Total Oxygen Demand in Water
 D6239 – 09(2015) Test Method for Uranium in Drinking Water by High-Resolution Alpha-Liquid-Scintillation Spectrometry
 D6240/D6240M – 12e1 Tables of Body Measurements for Mature Men, ages 35 and older, Sizes Thirty-Four to Fifty-Two (34 to 52) Short, Regular, and Tall
 D6241 – 14 Test Method for Static Puncture Strength of Geotextiles and Geotextile-Related Products Using a 50-mm Probe
 D6243/D6243M – 20 Test Method for Determining the Internal and Interface Shear Strength of Geosynthetic Clay Liner by the Direct Shear Method
 D6244 – 06(2018) Test Method for Vertical Compression of Geocomposite Pavement Panel Drains
 D6245 – 18 Guide for Using Indoor Carbon Dioxide Concentrations to Evaluate Indoor Air Quality and Ventilation
 D6246 – 08(2018) Practice for Evaluating the Performance of Diffusive Samplers
 D6247 – 18 Test Method for Determination of Elemental Content of Polyolefins by Wavelength Dispersive X-ray Fluorescence Spectrometry
 D6248 – 98(2012)e1 Test Method for Vinyl and Trans Unsaturation in Polyethylene by Infrared Spectrophotometry
 D6249 – 19 Guide for Alkaline Stabilization of Wastewater Treatment Plant Residuals
 D6251/D6251M – 19 Specification for Wood-Cleated Panelboard Shipping Boxes
 D6252/D6252M – 98(2019) Test Method for Peel Adhesion of Pressure-Sensitive Label Stocks at a 90° Angle
 D6253 – 16 Practice for Treatment and/or Marking of Wood Packaging Materials
 D6254/D6254M – 20 Specification for Wirebound Pallet-Type Wood Boxes
 D6255/D6255M – 18 Specification for Steel or Aluminum Slotted Angle Crates
 D6256/D6256M – 16 Specification for Wood-Cleated Shipping Boxes with Skidded, Load-Bearing Bases
 D6258 – 17 Test Method for Determination of Solvent Red 164 Dye Concentration in Diesel Fuels
 D6259 – 15(2019) Practice for Determination of a Pooled Limit of Quantitation for a Test Method
 D6261 – 14 Specification for Extruded and Compression Molded Basic Shapes Made from Thermoplastic Polyester (TPES)
 D6262 – 17 Specification for Extruded, Compression Molded, and Injection Molded Basic Shapes of Poly(aryl ether ketone) (PAEK)
 D6263 – 15 Specification for Extruded Rods and Bars Made From Rigid Poly(Vinyl Chloride) (PVC) and Chlorinated Poly(Vinyl Chloride) (CPVC)
 D6264/D6264M – 17 Test Method for Measuring the Damage Resistance of a Fiber-Reinforced Polymer-Matrix Composite to a Concentrated Quasi-Static Indentation Force
 D6265 – 17 Practice for Separation of Contaminants in Polymers Using an Extruder Filter Test
 D6266 – 00a(2017) Test Method for Determining the Amount of Volatile Organic Compound (VOC) Released From Waterborne Automotive Coatings and Available for Removal in a VOC Control Device (Abatement)
 D6267/D6267M – 13(2017) Test Method for Apparent Viscosity of Hydrocarbon Resins at Elevated Temperatures
 D6268 – 15 Practice for Handling, Transportation, and Storage of HFC-125, Pentafluoroethane (C2HF5)
 D6270 – 20 Practice for Use of Scrap Tires in Civil Engineering Applications
 D6271 – 10(2016) Test Method for Estimating Contribution of Environmental Tobacco Smoke to Respirable Suspended Particles Based on Solanesol
 D6272 – 17e1 Test Method for Flexural Properties of Unreinforced and Reinforced Plastics and Electrical Insulating Materials by Four-Point Bending
 D6273 – 20 Test Method for Natural Gas Odor Intensity
 D6274 – 18 Guide for Conducting Borehole Geophysical Logging – Gamma
 D6276 – 19 Test Method for Using pH to Estimate the Soil-Lime Proportion Requirement for Soil Stabilization
 D6277 – 07(2017) Test Method for Determination of Benzene in Spark-Ignition Engine Fuels Using Mid Infrared Spectroscopy
 D6278 – 20a Test Method for Shear Stability of Polymer Containing Fluids Using a European Diesel Injector Apparatus
 D6279 – 20 Test Method for Rub Abrasion Mar Resistance of High Gloss Coatings
 D6280 – 98(2020) Specification for Zinc Phosphate Pigments
 D6281 – 15 Test Method for Airborne Asbestos Concentration in Ambient and Indoor Atmospheres as Determined by Transmission Electron Microscopy Direct Transfer (TEM)
 D6282/D6282M – 14 Guide for Direct Push Soil Sampling for Environmental Site Characterizations
 D6283 – 21 Test Method for Tuft Element Length of Uncoated Pile Yarn Floor Coverings
 D6285 – 99(2016) Guide for Locating Abandoned Wells
 D6286/D6286M – 20 Guide for Selection of Drilling and Direct Push Methods for Geotechnical and Environmental Subsurface Site Characterization
 D6287 – 17 Practice for Cutting Film and Sheeting Test Specimens
 D6288 – 17 Practice for Separation and Washing of Recycled Plastics Prior to Testing
 D6289 – 13(2019) Test Method for Measuring Shrinkage from Mold Dimensions of Molded Thermosetting Plastics
 D6290 – 19 Test Method for Color Determination of Plastic Pellets
 D6294/D6294M – 13(2019) Test Method for Corrosion Resistance of Ferrous Metal Fastener Assemblies Used in Roofing and Waterproofing
 D6295/D6295M – 98(2019) Test Method for Dispensability of Light–Duty Pressure–Sensitive Film Tape
 D6296 – 98(2017) Test Method for Total Olefins in Spark-ignition Engine Fuels by Multidimensional Gas Chromatography
 D6297 – 20 Specification for Asphaltic Plug Joints for Bridges
 D6298/D6298M – 16 Specification for Fiberglass Reinforced Styrene-Butadiene-Styrene (SBS) Modified Bituminous Sheets with a Factory Applied Metal Surface
 D6299 – 20a Practice for Applying Statistical Quality Assurance and Control Charting Techniques to Evaluate Analytical Measurement System Performance
 D6300 – 20b Practice for Determination of Precision and Bias Data for Use in Test Methods for Petroleum Products, Liquid Fuels, and Lubricants

D6301-6400
 D6301 – 13 Practice for Collection of On-Line Composite Samples of Suspended Solids and Ionic Solids in Process Water
 D6302 – 98(2017) Practice for Evaluating the Kinetic Behavior of Ion Exchange Resins
 D6304 – 16e1 Test Method for Determination of Water in Petroleum Products, Lubricating Oils, and Additives by Coulometric Karl Fischer Titration
 D6305 – 08(2015)e1 Practice for Calculating Bending Strength Design Adjustment Factors for Fire-Retardant-Treated Plywood Roof Sheathing
 D6306 – 17 Guide for Placement and Use of Diffusive Samplers for Gaseous Pollutants in Indoor Air
 D6307 – 19 Test Method for Asphalt Content of Asphalt Mixture by Ignition Method
 D6311 – 98(2014) Guide for Generation of Environmental Data Related to Waste Management Activities: Selection and Optimization of Sampling Design
 D6312 – 17 Guide for Developing Appropriate Statistical Approaches for Groundwater Detection Monitoring Programs at Waste Disposal Facilities
 D6316 – 17 Test Method for Determination of Total, Combustible and Carbonate Carbon in Solid Residues from Coal and Coke
 D6317 – 15 Test Method for Low Level Determination of Total Carbon, Inorganic Carbon and Organic Carbon in Water by Ultraviolet, Persulfate Oxidation, and Membrane Conductivity Detection
 D6318 – 03(2014) Practice for Calibrating a Fathometer Using a Bar Check Method
 D6319 – 19 Specification for Nitrile Examination Gloves for Medical Application
 D6320/D6320M – 10(2014) Test Methods for Single Filament Hose Reinforcing Wire Made from Steel
 D6321/D6321M – 14 Practice for the Evaluation of Machine Washable T-shirts
 D6322 – 15 Guide to International Test Methods Associated with Textile Care Procedures
 D6323 – 19 Guide for Laboratory Subsampling of Media Related to Waste Management Activities
 D6324 – 11(2017) Specification for Male Condoms Made from Polyurethane
 D6325 – 98(2019) Test Method for Determining Open Assembly Time of Carpet Mastic Adhesives
 D6326 – 08(2014) Practice for The Selection of Maximum Transit-Rate Ratios and Depths for the U.S. Series of Isokinetic Suspended-Sediment Samplers
 D6327 – 10(2016) Test Method for Determination of Radon Decay Product Concentration and Working Level in Indoor Atmospheres by Active Sampling on a Filter
 D6328 – 18 Guide for Quality Assurance Protocols for Chemical Analysis of Atmospheric Wet Deposition
 D6329 – 98(2015) Guide for Developing Methodology for Evaluating the Ability of Indoor Materials to Support Microbial Growth Using Static Environmental Chambers
 D6330 – 20 Practice for Determination of Volatile Organic Compounds (Excluding Formaldehyde) Emissions from Wood-Based Panels Using Small Environmental Chambers Under Defined Test Conditions
 D6331 – 16 Test Method for Determination of Mass Concentration of Particulate Matter from Stationary Sources at Low Concentrations (Manual Gravimetric Method)
 D6332 – 12(2017) Guide for Testing Systems for Measuring Dynamic Responses of Carbon Monoxide Detectors to Gases and Vapors
 D6333 – 17 Practice for Collection of Dislodgeable Pesticide Residues from Floors
 D6334 – 12(2017)e1 Test Method for Sulfur in Gasoline by Wavelength Dispersive X-Ray Fluorescence
 D6335 – 19 Test Method for Determination of High Temperature Deposits by Thermo-Oxidation Engine Oil Simulation Test
 D6336 – 11(2017) Practice for Evaluation of Flushing Vehicles for Pigment Wetting Using a Vacuum Modified Sigma Blade Mixer
 D6337 – 98(2019) Practice for Physical Characterization of Woven Paint Applicator Fabrics
 D6338 – 17 Classification System for Highly Crosslinked Thermoplastic Vulcanizates (HCTPV) Based on ASTM Standard Test Methods
 D6339 – 11(2019) Classification System for and Basis for Specifications for Syndiotactic Polystyrene Molding and Extrusion (SPS)
 D6341 – 16 Test Method for Determination of the Linear Coefficient of Thermal Expansion of Plastic Lumber and Plastic Lumber Shapes Between −30 and 140 °F (−34.4 and 60 °C)
 D6342 – 12(2017)e1 Practice for Polyurethane Raw Materials: Determining Hydroxyl Number of Polyols by Near Infrared (NIR) Spectroscopy
 D6343 – 14(2018) Test Methods for Thin Thermally Conductive Solid Materials for Electrical Insulation and Dielectric Applications
 D6344 – 04(2017) Test Method for Concentrated Impacts to Transport Packages
 D6346 – 17 Guide for Accepting, Segregating, and Packaging Materials Collected Through Household Hazardous Waste Programs
 D6347/D6347M – 05(2018) Test Method for Determination of Bulk Density of Coal Using Nuclear Backscatter Depth Density Methods
 D6348 – 12(2020) Test Method for Determination of Gaseous Compounds by Extractive Direct Interface Fourier Transform Infrared (FTIR) Spectroscopy
 D6349 – 13 Test Method for Determination of Major and Minor Elements in Coal, Coke, and Solid Residues from Combustion of Coal and Coke by Inductively Coupled Plasma—Atomic Emission Spectrometry
 D6350 – 14 Test Method for Mercury Sampling and Analysis in Natural Gas by Atomic Fluorescence Spectroscopy
 D6351 – 10(2016) Test Method for Determination of Low Temperature Fluidity and Appearance of Hydraulic Fluids
 D6352 – 19e1 Test Method for Boiling Range Distribution of Petroleum Distillates in Boiling Range from 174 °C to 700 °C by Gas Chromatography
 D6353 – 06(2017)e1 Guide for Sampling Plan and Core Sampling for Prebaked Anodes Used in Aluminum Production
 D6354 – 12(2017) Guide for Sampling Plan and Core Sampling of Carbon Cathode Blocks Used in Aluminum Production
 D6355 – 07(2017) Test Method for Human Repeat Insult Patch Testing of Medical Gloves
 D6356/D6356M – 98(2018) Test Method for Hydrogen Gas Generation of Aluminum Emulsified Asphalt Used as a Protective Coating for Roofing
 D6357 – 19 Test Methods for Determination of Trace Elements in Coal, Coke, and Combustion Residues from Coal Utilization Processes by Inductively Coupled Plasma Atomic Emission Spectrometry, Inductively Coupled Plasma Mass Spectrometry, and Graphite Furnace Atomic Absorption Spectrometry
 D6358 – 19e1 Classification System and Basis for Specification for Poly (Phenylene Sulfide) (PPS) Injection Molding, Extrusion and Blow Molding Materials Using ISO Methods
 D6360 – 15 Practice for Enclosed Carbon-Arc Exposures of Plastics
 D6361/D6361M – 98(2020) Guide for Selecting Cleaning Agents and Processes
 D6362 – 98(2018) Practice for Certificates of Reference Materials for Water Analysis
 D6363 – 20 Test Method for Determination of Hydrogen Peroxide and Combined Organic Peroxides in Atmospheric Water Samples by Peroxidase Enzyme Fluorescence Method
 D6364 – 06(2018) Test Method for Determining Short-Term Compression Behavior of Geosynthetics
 D6365 – 99(2018) Practice for Nondestructive Testing of Geomembrane Seams Using the Spark Test
 D6367 – 17 Specification for AMS (α-Methylstyrene)
 D6368 – 06(2018) Specification for Vapor-Degreasing Solvents Based on normal-Propyl Bromide and Technical Grade normal-Propyl Bromide
 D6370 – 99(2019) Test Method for Rubber—Compositional Analysis by Thermogravimetry (TGA)
 D6371 – 17a Test Method for Cold Filter Plugging Point of Diesel and Heating Fuels
 D6372 – 15 Practice for Design, Testing, and Construction of Microsurfacing
 D6373 – 16 Specification for Performance Graded Asphalt Binder
 D6374 – 12(2017)e1 Test Method for Volatile Matter in Green Petroleum Coke Quartz Crucible Procedure
 D6375 – 09(2019) Test Method for Evaporation Loss of Lubricating Oils by Thermogravimetric Analyzer (TGA) Noack Method
 D6376 – 10(2017)e1 Test Method for Determination of Trace Metals in Petroleum Coke by Wavelength Dispersive X-ray Fluorescence Spectroscopy
 D6377 – 20 Test Method for Determination of Vapor Pressure of Crude Oil: VPCRx (Expansion Method)
 D6378 – 20 Test Method for Determination of Vapor Pressure (VPX) of Petroleum Products, Hydrocarbons, and Hydrocarbon-Oxygenate Mixtures (Triple Expansion Method)
 D6379 – 11(2019) Test Method for Determination of Aromatic Hydrocarbon Types in Aviation Fuels and Petroleum Distillates—High Performance Liquid Chromatography Method with Refractive Index Detection
 D6380/D6380M – 03(2018) Specification for Asphalt Roll Roofing (Organic Felt)
 D6381/D6381M – 15(2020) Test Method for Measurement of Asphalt Shingle Mechanical Uplift Resistance
 D6382/D6382M – 99(2017) Practice for Dynamic Mechanical Analysis and Thermogravimetry of Roofing and Waterproofing Membrane Material
 D6383/D6383M – 99(2015) Practice for Time-to-Failure (Creep-Rupture) of Adhesive Joints Fabricated from EPDM Roof Membrane Material
 D6384 – 19 Terminology Relating to Biodegradability and Ecotoxicity of Lubricants
 D6385 – 99(2017) Test Method for Determining Acid-Extractable Content in Activated Carbon by Ashing
 D6386 – 16a Practice for Preparation of Zinc (Hot-Dip Galvanized) Coated Iron and Steel Product and Hardware Surfaces for Painting
 D6387 – 19 Test Methods for Composition of Turpentine and Related Terpene Products by Capillary Gas Chromatography
 D6388 – 18 Practice for Tests to Evaluate the Chemical Resistance of Geonets to Liquids
 D6389 – 17 Practice for Tests to Evaluate the Chemical Resistance of Geotextiles to Liquids
 D6390 – 11(2017) Test Method for Determination of Draindown Characteristics in Uncompacted Asphalt Mixtures
 D6391 – 11(2020) Test Method for Field Measurement of Hydraulic Conductivity Using Borehole Infiltration
 D6392 – 12(2018) Test Method for Determining the Integrity of Nonreinforced Geomembrane Seams Produced Using Thermo-Fusion Methods
 D6393 – 14 Test Method for Bulk Solids Characterization by Carr Indices
 D6394 – 20 Classification System for and Basis for Specification for Sulfone Plastics (SP)
 D6396 – 99(2020) Test Method for Testing of Pipe Thread Sealants on Pipe Tees
 D6398 – 08(2014) Practice to Enhance Identification of Drug Names on Labels
 D6399 – 18 Guide for Selecting Instruments and Methods for Measuring Air Quality in Aircraft Cabins
 D6400 – 19 Specification for Labeling of Plastics Designed to be Aerobically Composted in Municipal or Industrial Facilities

D6401-6500
 D6401 – 99(2020) Test Method for Determining Non-Tannins and Tannin in Extracts of Vegetable Tanning Materials
 D6402 – 99(2020) Test Method for Determining Soluble Solids and Insolubles in Extracts of Vegetable Tanning Materials
 D6403 – 99(2020) Test Method for Determining Moisture in Raw and Spent Materials
 D6404 – 99(2020) Practice for Sampling Vegetable Materials Containing Tannin
 D6405 – 99(2020) Practice for Extraction of Tannins from Raw and Spent Materials
 D6406 – 99(2020) Test Method for Analysis of Sugar in Vegetable Tanning Materials
 D6407 – 99(2020) Test Method for Analysis of Iron and Copper in Vegetable Tanning Materials
 D6408 – 99(2020) Test Method for Analysis of Tannery Liquors
 D6409 – 99(2020) Practice for Color Tests with Sheepskin Skiver
 D6410 – 99(2020) Test Method for Determining Acidity of Vegetable Tanning Liquors
 D6411/D6411M – 99(2020) Specification for Silicone Rubber Room Temperature Vulcanizing Low Outgassing Materials
 D6412/D6412M – 99(2020) Specification for Epoxy (Flexible) Adhesive For Bonding Metallic And Nonmetallic Materials
 D6413/D6413M – 15 Test Method for Flame Resistance of Textiles (Vertical Test)
 D6414 – 14 Test Methods for Total Mercury in Coal and Coal Combustion Residues by Acid Extraction or Wet Oxidation/Cold Vapor Atomic Absorption
 D6415/D6415M – 06a(2013) Test Method for Measuring the Curved Beam Strength of a Fiber-Reinforced Polymer-Matrix Composite
 D6416/D6416M – 16 Test Method for Two-Dimensional Flexural Properties of Simply Supported Sandwich Composite Plates Subjected to a Distributed Load
 D6417 – 15(2019) Test Method for Estimation of Engine Oil Volatility by Capillary Gas Chromatography
 D6419 – 00(2017) Test Method for Volatile Content of Sheet-Fed and Coldset Web Offset Printing Inks
 D6420 – 18 Test Method for Determination of Gaseous Organic Compounds by Direct Interface Gas Chromatography-Mass Spectrometry
 D6421 – 20 Test Method for Evaluating Automotive Spark-Ignition Engine Fuel for Electronic Port Fuel Injector Fouling by Bench Procedure
 D6423 – 20a Test Method for Determination of pHe of Denatured Fuel Ethanol and Ethanol Fuel Blends
 D6424 – 04a(2019) Practice for Octane Rating Naturally Aspirated Spark Ignition Aircraft Engines
 D6425 – 19 Test Method for Measuring Friction and Wear Properties of Extreme Pressure (EP) Lubricating Oils Using SRV Test Machine
 D6426 – 18 Test Method for Determining Filterability of Middle Distillate Fuel Oils
 D6427 – 16 Practice for Handling, Transportation, and Storage of HFC-236fa, 1,1,1,3,3,3-Hexafluoropropane (CF3CH2CF3)
 D6429 – 20 Guide for Selecting Surface Geophysical Methods
 D6430 – 18 Guide for Using the Gravity Method for Subsurface Site Characterization
 D6431 – 18 Guide for Using the Direct Current Resistivity Method for Subsurface Site Characterization
 D6432 – 19 Guide for Using the Surface Ground Penetrating Radar Method for Subsurface Investigation
 D6433 – 20 Practice for Roads and Parking Lots Pavement Condition Index Surveys
 D6434 – 12(2018) Guide for the Selection of Test Methods for Flexible Polypropylene Geomembranes
 D6436 – 14 Guide for Reporting Properties for Plastics and Thermoplastic Elastomers
 D6437 – 05(2016)e1 Test Method for Polyurethane Raw Materials: Alkalinity in Low-Alkalinity Polyols (Determination of CPR Values of Polyols)
 D6438 – 05(2015) Test Method for Acetone, Methyl Acetate, and Parachlorobenzotrifluoride Content of Paints, and Coatings by Solid Phase Microextraction-Gas Chromatography
 D6439 – 11(2017) Guide for Cleaning, Flushing, and Purification of Steam, Gas, and Hydroelectric Turbine Lubrication Systems
 D6440 – 10(2018) Terminology Relating to Hydrocarbon Resins
 D6441 – 05(2016) Test Methods for Measuring the Hiding Power of Powder Coatings
 D6442 – 06(2020) Test Method for Determination of Copper Release Rate From Antifouling Coatings in Substitute Ocean Water
 D6443 – 14(2019)e1 Test Method for Determination of Calcium, Chlorine, Copper, Magnesium, Phosphorus, Sulfur, and Zinc in Unused Lubricating Oils and Additives by Wavelength Dispersive X-ray Fluorescence Spectrometry (Mathematical Correction Procedure)
 D6447 – 09(2014) Test Method for Hydroperoxide Number of Aviation Turbine Fuels by Voltammetric Analysis
 D6448 – 16 Specification for Industrial Burner Fuels from Used Lubricating Oils
 D6449 – 99(2015)e1 Test Method for Flow of Fine Aggregate Concrete for Fabric Formed Concrete (Flow Cone Method)
 D6450 – 16a Test Method for Flash Point by Continuously Closed Cup (CCCFP) Tester
 D6451/D6451M – 99(2014)e1 Guide for Application of Asphalt Based Protection Board
 D6452 – 18 Guide for Purging Methods for Wells Used for Ground Water Quality Investigations
 D6454/D6454M – 99(2016)e1 Test Method for Determining the Short-Term Compression Behavior of Turf Reinforcement Mats (TRMs)
 D6455 – 11(2018) Guide for the Selection of Test Methods for Prefabricated Bituminous Geomembranes (PBGMs)
 D6456 – 10(2018) Specification for Finished Parts Made from Polyimide Resin
 D6458/D6458M – 19 Tables of Body Measurements for Boys, Sizes 4 to 20 Slim and 2 to 20 Regular
 D6459 – 19 Test Method for Determination of Rolled Erosion Control Product (RECP) Performance in Protecting Hillslopes from Rainfall-Induced Erosion
 D6460 – 19 Test Method for Determination of Rolled Erosion Control Product (RECP) Performance in Protecting Earthen Channels from Stormwater-Induced Erosion
 D6461/D6461M – 18 Specifications for Silt Fence Materials
 D6462 – 19 Practice for Silt Fence Installation and Maintenance
 D6463/D6463M – 06(2020) Test Method for Time to Failure of Pressure Sensitive Articles Under Sustained Shear Loading
 D6464 – 03a(2017) Specification for Expandable Foam Adhesives for Fastening Gypsum Wallboard to Wood Framing
 D6465 – 99(2016) Guide for Selecting Aerospace and General Purpose Adhesives and Sealants
 D6466 – 10(2018) Test Method for Diameter of Wool and Other Animal Fibers By Sirolan-Laserscan Fiber Diameter Analyser
 D6467 – 13e1 Test Method for Torsional Ring Shear Test to Determine Drained Residual Shear Strength of Cohesive Soils
 D6468 – 08(2019) Test Method for High Temperature Stability of Middle Distillate Fuels
 D6469 – 20 Guide for Microbial Contamination in Fuels and Fuel Systems
 D6470 – 99(2020) Test Method for Salt in Crude Oils (Potentiometric Method)
 D6473 – 15 Test Method For Specific Gravity And Absorption of Rock For Erosion Control
 D6474 – 20 Test Method for Determining Molecular Weight Distribution and Molecular Weight Averages of Polyolefins by High Temperature Gel Permeation Chromatography
 D6475 – 17 Test Method for Measuring Mass per Unit Area of Erosion Control Blankets
 D6476 – 12(2017)e1 Test Method for Determining Dynamic Air Permeability of Inflatable Restraint Fabrics
 D6477 – 13e1 Terminology Relating to Tire Cord, Bead Wire, Hose Reinforcing Wire, and Fabrics
 D6478 – 10(2019) Test Method for Determining Specific Packability of Fabrics Used in Inflatable Restraints
 D6479 – 15(2020) Test Method for Determining the Edgecomb Resistance of Woven Fabrics Used in Inflatable Restraints
 D6480 – 19 Test Method for Wipe Sampling of Surfaces, Indirect Preparation, and Analysis for Asbestos Structure Number Surface Loading by Transmission Electron Microscopy
 D6481 – 14(2019) Test Method for Determination of Phosphorus, Sulfur, Calcium, and Zinc in Lubrication Oils by Energy Dispersive X-ray Fluorescence Spectroscopy
 D6482 – 06(2016) Test Method for Determination of Cooling Characteristics of Aqueous Polymer Quenchants by Cooling Curve Analysis with Agitation (Tensi Method)
 D6484/D6484M – 20 Test Method for Open-Hole Compressive Strength of Polymer Matrix Composite Laminates
 D6485 – 18 Guide for Risk Characterization of Acute and Irritant Effects of Short-Term Exposure to Volatile Organic Chemicals Emitted from Bedding Sets
 D6486 – 01(2017) Practice for Short Term Vehicle Service Exposure of Automotive Coatings
 D6487 – 10(2019) Practice for Preparing Prints of Paste Printing Inks Using a Hand Operated Laboratory Flat-Bed Press
 D6488 – 08(2020) Terminology Relating to Print Problems
 D6489 – 99(2020) Test Method for Determining the Water Absorption of Hardened Concrete Treated With a Water Repellent Coating
 D6490 – 99(2014) Test Method for Water Vapor Transmission of NonFilm Forming Treatments Used on Cementitious Panels
 D6491 – 09(2016) Practice for Evaluation of Aging Resistance of Prestressed Prepainted Metal In a Dry Heat Test
 D6492 – 99(2016) Practice for Detection of Hexavalent Chromium On Zinc and Zinc/Aluminum Alloy Coated Steel
 D6493 – 11(2015) Test Methods for Softening Point of Hydrocarbon Resins and Rosin Based Resins by Automated Ring-and-Ball Apparatus
 D6494 – 99(2015) Test Method for Determination of Asphalt Fume Particulate Matter in Workplace Atmospheres as Benzene Soluble Fraction
 D6495/D6495M – 18 Guide for Acceptance Testing Requirements for Geosynthetic Clay Liners
 D6496/D6496M – 20 Test Method for Determining Average Bonding Peel Strength Between Top and Bottom Layers of Needle-Punched Geosynthetic Clay Liners
 D6497/D6497M – 02(2015)e1 Guide for Mechanical Attachment of Geomembrane to Penetrations or Structures
 D6499 – 18 Test Method for Immunological Measurement of Antigenic Protein in Hevea Natural Rubber (HNR) and its Products
 D6500 – 00(2012)e1 Test Method for Diameter of Wool and Other Animal Fibers Using an Optical Fiber Diameter Analyser

D6501-6600
 D6501 – 15 Test Method for Phosphonate in Brines
 D6502 – 10(2015) Test Method for Measurement of On-line Integrated Samples of Low Level Suspended Solids and Ionic Solids in Process Water by X-Ray Fluorescence (XRF)
 D6503 – 19 Test Method for Enterococci in Water Using Enterolert
 D6504 – 11(2016)e1 Practice for On-Line Determination of Cation Conductivity in High Purity Water
 D6505 – 00(2017) Test Method for Assay of normal-Propyl Bromide Content
 D6506/D6506M – 01(2018)e1 Specification for Asphalt Based Protection Board for Below-Grade Waterproofing
 D6507 – 19 Practice for Fiber Reinforcement Orientation Codes for Composite Materials
 D6508 – 15 Test Method for Determination of Dissolved Inorganic Anions in Aqueous Matrices Using Capillary Ion Electrophoresis and Chromate Electrolyte
 D6509/D6509M – 16 Specification for Atactic Polypropylene (APP) Modified Bituminous Base Sheet Materials Using Glass Fiber Reinforcements
 D6511/D6511M – 18 Test Methods for Solvent Bearing Bituminous Compounds
 D6512 – 07(2014) Practice for Interlaboratory Quantitation Estimate
 D6513 – 14 Practice for Calculating the Superimposed Load on Wood-frame Walls for Standard Fire-Resistance Tests
 D6514 – 03(2019)e1 Test Method for High Temperature Universal Oxidation Test for Turbine Oils
 D6515 – 00(2016) Test Method for Rubber Shaft Seals Determination of Recovery From Bending
 D6517 – 18 Guide for Field Preservation of Ground Water Samples
 D6519 – 15 Practice for Sampling of Soil Using the Hydraulically Operated Stationary Piston Sampler
 D6520 – 18 Practice for the Solid Phase Micro Extraction (SPME) of Water and its Headspace for the Analysis of Volatile and Semi-Volatile Organic Compounds
 D6521 – 19a Practice for Accelerated Aging of Asphalt Binder Using a Pressurized Aging Vessel (PAV)
 D6522 – 20 Test Method for Determination of Nitrogen Oxides, Carbon Monoxide, and Oxygen Concentrations in Emissions from Natural Gas-Fired Reciprocating Engines, Combustion Turbines, Boilers, and Process Heaters Using Portable Analyzers
 D6523 – 00(2014)e1 Guide for Evaluation and Selection of Alternative Daily Covers (ADCs) for Sanitary Landfills
 D6524/D6524M – 16 Test Method for Measuring the Resiliency of Turf Reinforcement Mats (TRMs)
 D6525/D6525M – 18 Test Method for Measuring Nominal Thickness of Rolled Erosion Control Products
 D6528 – 17 Test Method for Consolidated Undrained Direct Simple Shear Testing of Fine Grain Soils
 D6530 – 19 Test Method for Total Active Biomass in Cooling Tower Waters (Kool Kount Assay; KKA)
 D6531 – 00(2019) Test Method for Relative Tinting Strength of Aqueous Ink Systems by Instrumental Measurement
 D6532 – 00(2014) Test Method for Evaluation of the Effect of Clear Water Repellent Treatments on Water Absorption of Hydraulic Cement Mortar Specimens
 D6534 – 18 Practice for Determining the Peak Force-to-Actuate of a Mechanical Pump Dispenser
 D6535/D6535M – 18 Practice for Determining the Dip Tube Length of a Mechanical Pump Dispenser
 D6536/D6536M – 18 Practice for Measuring the Dip Tube Length of a Mechanical Pump Dispenser
 D6537 – 00(2014) Practice for Instrumented Package Shock Testing For Determination of Package Performance
 D6538 – 12(2019) Guide for Sampling Wastewater With Automatic Samplers
 D6539 – 13 Test Method for Measurement of the Permeability of Unsaturated Porous Materials by Flowing Air
 D6540 – 17 Test Method for Accelerated Soiling of Pile Yarn Floor Covering
 D6541 – 11(2015) Specification for HFC-236fa, 1,1,1,3,3,3–Hexafluoropropane, (CF3CH2CF3)
 D6542 – 05(2018)e1 Practice for Tonnage Calculation of Coal in a Stockpile
 D6543 – 20 Guide to the Evaluation of Measurements Made by Online Coal Analyzers
 D6544 – 12 Practice for Preparation of Textiles Prior to Ultraviolet (UV) Transmission Testing
 D6545 – 18 Test Method for Flammability of Textiles Used in Children's Sleepwear
 D6546 – 15 Test Methods for and Suggested Limits for Determining Compatibility of Elastomer Seals for Industrial Hydraulic Fluid Applications
 D6547 – 16 Test Method for Corrosiveness of Lubricating Fluid to Bimetallic Couple
 D6549 – 06(2015) Test Method for Determination of Cooling Characteristics of Quenchants by Cooling Curve Analysis with Agitation (Drayton Unit)
 D6550 – 20 Test Method for Determination of Olefin Content of Gasolines by Supercritical-Fluid Chromatography
 D6551/D6551M – 05(2019) Practice for Accelerated Weathering of Pressure-Sensitive Tapes by Xenon-Arc Exposure Apparatus
 D6552 – 06(2016) Practice for Controlling and Characterizing Errors in Weighing Collected Aerosols
 D6553 – 00(2016) Test Method for Coolant Compatibility of Way Lubricants
 D6554/D6554M – 14 Specification for 100% Cotton Denim Fabrics
 D6555 – 17 Guide for Evaluating System Effects in Repetitive-Member Wood Assemblies
 D6556 – 19a Test Method for Carbon Black—Total and External Surface Area by Nitrogen Adsorption
 D6557 – 18 Test Method for Evaluation of Rust Preventive Characteristics of Automotive Engine Oils
 D6558 – 00A(2015)e1 Test Method for Determination of TGA CO2 Reactivity of Baked Carbon Anodes and Cathode Blocks
 D6559 – 00A(2016)e1 Test Method for Determination of Thermogravimetric (TGA) Air Reactivity of Baked Carbon Anodes and Cathode Blocks
 D6560 – 17 Test Method for Determination of Asphaltenes (Heptane Insolubles) in Crude Petroleum and Petroleum Products
 D6561 – 20 Test Method for Determination of Aerosol Monomeric and Oligomeric Hexamethylene Diisocyanate (HDl) in Air with (Methoxy-2–phenyl-1) Piperazine (MOPIP) in the Workplace
 D6562 – 20 Test Method for Determination of Gaseous Hexamethylene Diisocyanate (HDI) in Air with 9-(N-methylaminomethyl) Anthracene Method (MAMA) in the Workplace
 D6564/D6564M – 17 Guide for Field Filtration of Groundwater Samples
 D6566 – 18 Test Method for Measuring Mass Per Unit Area of Turf Reinforcement Mats
 D6567 – 18 Test Method for Measuring the Light Penetration of a Rolled Erosion Control Product (RECP)
 D6568 – 00(2018) Guide for Planning, Carrying Out, and Reporting Traceable Chemical Analyses of Water Samples
 D6569 – 14 Test Method for On-Line Measurement of pH
 D6570 – 18a Practice for Assigning Allowable Properties for Mechanically Graded Lumber
 D6572 – 20 Test Methods for Determining Dispersive Characteristics of Clayey Soils by the Crumb Test
 D6573/D6573M – 13(2020) Specification for General Purpose Wirebound Shipping Boxes
 D6574/D6574M – 13e1 Test Method for Determining the (In-Plane) Hydraulic Transmissivity of a Geosynthetic by Radial Flow
 D6575/D6575M – 16 Test Method for Determining Stiffness of Geosynthetics Used as Turf Reinforcement Mats (TRMs)
 D6576 – 20 Specification for Flexible Cellular Rubber Chemically Blown
 D6577 – 15(2019) Guide for Testing Industrial Protective Coatings
 D6578/D6578M – 13(2018) Practice for Determination of Graffiti Resistance
 D6579 – 11(2020) Practice for Molecular Weight Averages and Molecular Weight Distribution of Hydrocarbon, Rosin and Terpene Resins by Size-Exclusion Chromatography
 D6580 – 17 Test Method for The Determination of Metallic Zinc Content in Both Zinc Dust Pigment and in Cured Films of Zinc-Rich Coatings
 D6581 – 18 Test Methods for Bromate, Bromide, Chlorate, and Chlorite in Drinking Water by Suppressed Ion Chromatography
 D6583 – 13(2019) Test Method for Porosity of Paint Film by Mineral Oil Absorption
 D6584 – 17 Test Method for Determination of Total Monoglycerides, Total Diglycerides, Total Triglycerides, and Free and Total Glycerin in B-100 Biodiesel Methyl Esters by Gas Chromatography
 D6585 – 17 Specification for Unsintered Polytetrafluoroethylene (PTFE) Extruded Film or Tape
 D6586 – 03(2014) Practice for the Prediction of Contaminant Adsorption On GAC In Aqueous Systems Using Rapid Small-Scale Column Tests
 D6587 – 12(2018) Test Method for Yarn Number Using Automatic Tester
 D6588/D6588M – 11(2016) Test Method for Fatigue of Tire Cords (Disc Fatigue Test)
 D6589 – 05(2015) Guide for Statistical Evaluation of Atmospheric Dispersion Model Performance
 D6590/D6590M – 00(2020) Specification for Pressure-Sensitive Tape for Sealing Fiber Containers and Cans
 D6591 – 19 Test Method for Determination of Aromatic Hydrocarbon Types in Middle Distillates—High Performance Liquid Chromatography Method with Refractive Index Detection
 D6593 – 18 Test Method for Evaluation of Automotive Engine Oils for Inhibition of Deposit Formation in a Spark-Ignition Internal Combustion Engine Fueled with Gasoline and Operated Under Low-Temperature, Light-Duty Conditions
 D6594 – 20 Test Method for Evaluation of Corrosiveness of Diesel Engine Oil at 135 °C
 D6595 – 17 Test Method for Determination of Wear Metals and Contaminants in Used Lubricating Oils or Used Hydraulic Fluids by Rotating Disc Electrode Atomic Emission Spectrometry
 D6596 – 00(2016) Practice for Ampulization and Storage of Gasoline and Related Hydrocarbon Materials
 D6598 – 19 Guide for Installing and Operating Settlement Points for Monitoring Vertical Deformations
 D6599 – 00(2014)e2 Practice for Construction of Live Fascines on Slopes
 D6600 – 00(2017) Practice for Evaluating Test Sensitivity for Rubber Test Methods

D6601-6700
 D6601 – 19 Test Method for Rubber Properties—Measurement of Cure and After-Cure Dynamic Properties Using a Rotorless Shear Rheometer
 D6602 – 13(2018) Practice for Sampling and Testing of Possible Carbon Black Fugitive Emissions or Other Environmental Particulate, or Both
 D6603 – 19 Specification for Labeling of UV-Protective Textiles
 D6604 – 00(2017) Practice for Glass Transition Temperatures of Hydrocarbon Resins by Differential Scanning Calorimetry
 D6605 – 06(2020) Practice for Determining the Color Stability of Hydrocarbon Resins After Heating
 D6606 – 00(2017) Test Method for Viscosity and Yield of Vehicles and Varnishes by the Duke Viscometer
 D6607 – 00(2015) Practice for Inclusion of Precision Statement Variation in Specification Limits
 D6608 – 20 Practice for the Identification of Trinidad Lake Asphalt in Asphalt Mixes
 D6609 – 17 Guide for Part-Stream Sampling of Coal
 D6611 – 16 Test Method for Wet and Dry Yarn-on-Yarn Abrasion Resistance
 D6612 – 00(2016) Test Method for Yarn Number and Yarn Number Variability Using Automated Tester
 D6613 – 08(2019) Practice for Determining the Presence of Sizing in Nylon or Polyester Fabric
 D6614/D6614M – 20 Test Method for Stretch Properties of Textile Fabrics – CRE Method
 D6615 – 15a(2019) Specification for Jet B Wide-Cut Aviation Turbine Fuel
 D6616 – 21 Test Method for Measuring Viscosity at High Shear Rate by Tapered Bearing Simulator Viscometer at 100 °C
 D6617 – 17 Practice for Laboratory Bias Detection Using Single Test Result from Standard Material
 D6618 – 16 Test Method for Evaluation of Engine Oils in Diesel Four-Stroke Cycle Supercharged 1M-PC Single Cylinder Oil Test Engine
 D6619 – 00(2016) Practice for Incorporating Pigments by High Speed Dispersion
 D6620 – 19 Practice for Asbestos Detection Limit Based on Counts
 D6621 – 00(2017) Practice for Performance Testing of Process Analyzers for Aromatic Hydrocarbon Materials
 D6622/D6622M – 20 Guide for Application of Fully Adhered Hot-Applied Reinforced Waterproofing Systems
 D6624 – 20 Practice for Determining a Flow-Proportioned Average Property Value (FPAPV) for a Collected Batch of Process Stream Material Using Stream Analyzer Data
 D6625 – 13(2020) Practice for Conducting a Test of Protective Properties of Polish Applied to a Painted Panel Using Fluorescent UV-Condensation Light- and Water-Exposure Apparatus
 D6626 – 15 Specification for Performance Graded Trinidad Lake Modified Asphalt Binder
 D6627/D6627M – 11(2016) Test Method for Determination of a Volatile Distillate Fraction of Cold Asphalt Mixtures
 D6628 – 16 Specification for Color of Pavement Marking Materials
 D6630/D6630M – 16 Guide for Low Slope Insulated Roof Membrane Assembly Performance
 D6631 – 05(2019) Guide for Committee D01 for Conducting an Interlaboratory Study for the Purpose of Determining the Precision of a Test Method
 D6633 – 18 Practice for Basic Functional Stability of a Mechanical Pump Dispenser
 D6634/D6634M – 14 Guide for the Selection of Purging and Sampling Devices for Groundwater Monitoring Wells
 D6635 – 15 Test Method for Performing the Flat Plate Dilatometer
 D6636 – 01(2018) Test Method for Determination of Ply Adhesion Strength of Reinforced Geomembranes
 D6637/D6637M – 15 Test Method for Determining Tensile Properties of Geogrids by the Single or Multi-Rib Tensile Method
 D6638 – 18 Test Method for Determining Connection Strength Between Geosynthetic Reinforcement and Segmental Concrete Units (Modular Concrete Blocks)
 D6639 – 18 Guide for Using the Frequency Domain Electromagnetic Method for Subsurface Site Characterizations
 D6640 – 01(2015) Practice for Collection and Handling of Soils Obtained in Core Barrel Samplers for Environmental Investigations
 D6641/D6641M – 16e1 Test Method for Compressive Properties of Polymer Matrix Composite Materials Using a Combined Loading Compression (CLC) Test Fixture
 D6643 – 01(2016) Test Method for Testing Wood-Base Panel Corner Impact Resistance
 D6644 – 01(2013) Test Method for Tension Strength of Sew-Through Flange Buttons
 D6645 – 18 Test Method for Methyl (Comonomer) Content in Polyethylene by Infrared Spectrophotometry
 D6646 – 03(2014) Test Method for Determination of the Accelerated Hydrogen Sulfide Breakthrough Capacity of Granular and Pelletized Activated Carbon
 D6647 – 18 Test Method for Determination of Acid Soluble Iron via Atomic Absorption
 D6648 – 08(2016) Test Method for Determining the Flexural Creep Stiffness of Asphalt Binder Using the Bending Beam Rheometer (BBR)
 D6653/D6653M – 13 Test Methods for Determining the Effects of High Altitude on Packaging Systems by Vacuum Method
 D6654 – 18 Practice for Basic Storage Stability of a Mechanical Pump Dispenser
 D6656 – 16 Test Method for Determination of Chromic Oxide in Wet Blue (Perchloric Acid Oxidation)
 D6657 – 16 Test Method for pH of Wet Blue and Wet White
 D6658 – 08(2020) Test Method for Volatile Matter (Moisture) of Wet Blue by Oven Drying
 D6659 – 16 Practice for Sampling and Preparation of Wet Blue and Wet White for Physical and Chemical Tests
 D6660 – 01(2019) Test Method for Freezing Point of Aqueous Ethylene Glycol Base Engine Coolants by Automatic Phase Transition Method
 D6661 – 17 Practice for Field Collection of Organic Compounds from Surfaces Using Wipe Sampling
 D6662 – 17 Specification for Polyolefin-Based Plastic Lumber Decking Boards
 D6663 – 08(2019) Specification for Woven and Knitted Comforter and Accessory Products for Institutional and Household Use
 D6665 – 09(2019) Practice for Evaluation of Aging Resistance of Pre-stressed Prepainted Metal in a Boiling Water Test
 D6666 – 20 Guide for Evaluation of Aqueous Polymer Quenchants
 D6667 – 14(2019) Test Method for Determination of Total Volatile Sulfur in Gaseous Hydrocarbons and Liquefied Petroleum Gases by Ultraviolet Fluorescence
 D6668 – 01(2016) Test Method for Discrimination Between Flammability Ratings of F = 0 and F = 1
 D6669 – 19 Practice for Selecting and Constructing Exposure Scenarios for Assessment of Exposures to Alkyd and Latex Interior Paints
 D6670 – 18 Practice for Full-Scale Chamber Determination of Volatile Organic Emissions from Indoor Materials/Products
 D6671/D6671M – 19 Test Method for Mixed Mode I-Mode II Interlaminar Fracture Toughness of Unidirectional Fiber Reinforced Polymer Matrix Composites
 D6674 – 01(2017) Guide for Proficiency Test Program for Fabrics
 D6675 – 01(2015) Practice for Salt-Accelerated Outdoor Cosmetic Corrosion Testing of Organic Coatings on Automotive Sheet Steel
 D6676/D6676M – 13 Test Method for Cathodic Disbonding of Exterior Pipeline Coatings at Elevated Temperatures Using Interior Heating
 D6677 – 18 Test Method for Evaluating Adhesion by Knife
 D6681 – 17 Test Method for Evaluation of Engine Oils in a High Speed, Single-Cylinder Diesel Engine—Caterpillar 1P Test Procedure
 D6683 – 19 Test Method for Measuring Bulk Density Values of Powders and Other Bulk Solids as Function of Compressive Stress
 D6684 – 18 Specification for Materials and Manufacture of Articulating Concrete Block (ACB) Systems
 D6685 – 01(2015) Guide for the Selection of Test Methods for Fabrics Used for Fabric Formed Concrete (FFC)
 D6686 – 01(2019) Test Method for Evaluation of Tannin Stain Resistance of Coatings
 D6687 – 07(2020) Guide for Testing Printing Ink Vehicles and Components Thereof
 D6688 – 20 Practice for Relative Resistance of Printed Matter to Liquid Chemicals by a Sandwich Technique
 D6690 – 15 Specification for Joint and Crack Sealants, Hot Applied, for Concrete and Asphalt Pavements
 D6691 – 17 Test Method for Determining Aerobic Biodegradation of Plastic Materials in the Marine Environment by a Defined Microbial Consortium or Natural Sea Water Inoculum
 D6693/D6693M – 20 Test Method for Determining Tensile Properties of Nonreinforced Polyethylene and Nonreinforced Flexible Polypropylene Geomembranes
 D6694/D6694M – 15 Specification for Liquid-Applied Silicone Coating Used in Spray Polyurethane Foam Roofing Systems
 D6695 – 16 Practice for Xenon-Arc Exposures of Paint and Related Coatings
 D6696 – 16 Guide for Understanding Cyanide Species
 D6698 – 14 Test Method for On-Line Measurement of Turbidity Below 5 NTU in Water
 D6699 – 16 Practice for Sampling Liquids Using Bailers
 D6700 – 19 Guide for Use of Scrap Tires as Tire-Derived Fuel

D6701-6800
 D6701 – 16 Test Method for Determining Water Vapor Transmission Rates Through Nonwoven and Plastic Barriers
 D6703 – 19 Test Method for Automated Heithaus Titrimetry
 D6704 – 08(2015) Test Method for Determining the Workability of Asphalt Cold Mix Patching Material
 D6705/D6705M – 04(2018) Guide for Repair and Recoat of Spray Polyurethane Foam Roofing Systems
 D6706 – 01(2013) Test Method for Measuring Geosynthetic Pullout Resistance in Soil
 D6707/D6707M – 06(2019) Specification for Circular-Knit Geotextile for Use in Subsurface Drainage Applications
 D6708 – 19ae1 Practice for Statistical Assessment and Improvement of Expected Agreement Between Two Test Methods that Purport to Measure the Same Property of a Material
 D6709 – 15a Test Method for Evaluation of Automotive Engine Oils in the Sequence VIII Spark-Ignition Engine (CLR Oil Test Engine)
 D6710 – 17 Guide for Evaluation of Hydrocarbon-Based Quench Oil
 D6711 – 15 Practice for Specifying Rock to Fill Gabions, Revet Mattresses, and Gabion Mattresses
 D6712 – 17 Specification for Ultra-High-Molecular-Weight Polyethylene (UHMW-PE) Solid Plastic Shapes
 D6713 – 19 Specification for Extruded and Compression Molded Shapes Made from Poly(Vinylidene Fluoride) (PVDF)
 D6714 – 16 Test Method for Chromic Oxide in Ashed Wet Blue (Perchloric Acid Oxidation)
 D6715 – 13(2020) Practice for Sampling and Preparation of Fresh or Salt-Preserved (Cured) Hides and Skins for Chemical and Physical Tests
 D6716 – 08(2020) Test Method for Total Ash in Wet Blue or Wet White
 D6717 – 07(2018) Test Method for Linear Density of Elastomeric Yarns (Skein Specimens)
 D6719 – 12 Guide for Standard Test Methods and Practices for Evaluating Pile Yarn Floor Covering
 D6720 – 07(2018) Test Method for Evaluation of Recoverable Stretch of Stretch Yarns (Skein Method)
 D6721 – 01(2015) Test Method for Determination of Chlorine in Coal by Oxidative Hydrolysis Microcoulometry
 D6722 – 19 Test Method for Total Mercury in Coal and Coal Combustion Residues by Direct Combustion Analysis
 D6723 – 12 Test Method for Determining the Fracture Properties of Asphalt Binder in Direct Tension (DT)
 D6724/D6724M – 16 Guide for Installation of Direct Push Groundwater Monitoring Wells
 D6725/D6725M – 16 Practice for Direct Push Installation of Prepacked Screen Monitoring Wells in Unconsolidated Aquifers
 D6726 – 15 Guide for Conducting Borehole Geophysical Logging—Electromagnetic Induction
 D6727/D6727M – 16 Guide for Conducting Borehole Geophysical Logging—Neutron
 D6728 – 16 Test Method for Determination of Contaminants in Gas Turbine and Diesel Engine Fuel by Rotating Disc Electrode Atomic Emission Spectrometry
 D6729 – 20 Test Method for Determination of Individual Components in Spark Ignition Engine Fuels by 100 Metre Capillary High Resolution Gas Chromatography
 D6730 – 19 Test Method for Determination of Individual Components in Spark Ignition Engine Fuels by 100-Metre Capillary (with Precolumn) High-Resolution Gas Chromatography
 D6731 – 18 Test Method for Determining the Aerobic, Aquatic Biodegradability of Lubricants or Lubricant Components in a Closed Respirometer
 D6732 – 04(2020) Test Method for Determination of Copper in Jet Fuels by Graphite Furnace Atomic Absorption Spectrometry
 D6733 – 01(2020) Test Method for Determination of Individual Components in Spark Ignition Engine Fuels by 50-Metre Capillary High Resolution Gas Chromatography
 D6736 – 08(2019) Test Method for Burnish Resistance of Latex Paints
 D6737 – 12(2017) Test Method for Bulk Density of Tapered Paintbrush Filaments
 D6738 – 15(2019) Test Method for Precipitated Silica—Volatile Content
 D6739 – 20 Test Method for Silica—pH Value
 D6740 – 15(2019) Test Method for Silanes Used in Rubber Formulations(bis-(triethoxysilylpropyl)sulfanes): Residue on Ignition
 D6741 – 10(2019) Test Methods for Silanes Used in Rubber Formulations(bis-(triethoxysilylpropyl)sulfanes): Sulfur Content
 D6742/D6742M – 17 Practice for Filled-Hole Tension and Compression Testing of Polymer Matrix Composite Laminates
 D6743 – 20 Test Method for Thermal Stability of Organic Heat Transfer Fluids
 D6744 – 06(2017)e1 Test Method for Determination of the Thermal Conductivity of Anode Carbons by the Guarded Heat Flow Meter Technique
 D6745 – 11(2015) Test Method for Linear Thermal Expansion of Electrode Carbons
 D6746 – 15(2020) Test Method for Determination of Green Strength and Stress Relaxation of Raw Rubber or Unvulcanized Compounds
 D6747 – 15 Guide for Selection of Techniques for Electrical Leak Location of Leaks in Geomembranes
 D6748 – 02a(2017) Test Method for Determination of Potential Instability of Middle Distillate Fuels Caused by the Presence of Phenalenes and Phenalenones (Rapid Method by Portable Spectrophotometer)
 D6749 – 02(2018) Test Method for Pour Point of Petroleum Products (Automatic Air Pressure Method)
 D6750 – 19 Test Methods for Evaluation of Engine Oils in a High-Speed, Single-Cylinder Diesel Engine—1K Procedure (0.4% Fuel Sulfur) and 1N Procedure (0.04% Fuel Sulfur)
 D6751 – 20a Specification for Biodiesel Fuel Blend Stock (B100) for Middle Distillate Fuels
 D6752/D6752M – 18 Test Method for Bulk Specific Gravity and Density of Compacted Asphalt Mixtures Using Automatic Vacuum Sealing Method
 D6753/D6753M – 02(2016) Specification for Coal Tar Adhesive
 D6754/D6754M – 15 Specification for Ketone Ethylene Ester Based Sheet Roofing
 D6756 – 17 Test Method for Determination of the Red Dye Concentration and Estimation of the ASTM Color of Diesel Fuel and Heating Oil Using a Portable Visible Spectrophotometer
 D6757/D6757M – 18 Specification for Underlayment Felt Containing Inorganic Fibers Used in Steep-Slope Roofing
 D6758 – 18 Test Method for Measuring Stiffness and Apparent Modulus of Soil and Soil-Aggregate In-Place by Electro-Mechanical Method
 D6759 – 16 Practice for Sampling Liquids Using Grab and Discrete Depth Samplers
 D6760 – 16 Test Method for Integrity Testing of Concrete Deep Foundations by Ultrasonic Crosshole Testing
 D6761 – 17 Test Method for Determination of the Total Pore Volume of Catalysts and Catalyst Carriers
 D6762 – 18 Test Method for Determining the Hiding Power of Paint by Visual Evaluation of Spray Applied Coatings
 D6763 – 16 Guide for Testing Exterior Wood Stains and Clear Water Repellents
 D6764 – 02(2019) Guide for Collection of Water Temperature, Dissolved-Oxygen Concentrations, Specific Electrical Conductance, and pH Data from Open Channels
 D6765 – 13 Practice for Live Staking
 D6766 – 20a Test Method for Evaluation of Hydraulic Properties of Geosynthetic Clay Liners Permeated with Potentially Incompatible Aqueous Solutions
 D6767 – 20a Test Method for Pore Size Characteristics of Geotextiles by Capillary Flow Test
 D6768/D6768M – 20 Test Method for Tensile Strength of Geosynthetic Clay Liners
 D6769/D6769M – 02(2018) Guide for Application of Fully Adhered, Cold-Applied, Prefabricated Reinforced Modified Bituminous Membrane Waterproofing Systems
 D6770 – 07(2019) Test Method for Abrasion Resistance of Textile Webbing (Hex Bar Method)
 D6771 – 18 Practice for Low-Flow Purging and Sampling for Wells and Devices Used for Ground-Water Quality Investigations
 D6772/D6772M – 16 Test Method for Dimensional Stability of Sandwich Core Materials
 D6773 – 16 Test Method for Bulk Solids Using Schulze Ring Shear Tester
 D6775 – 13(2017) Test Method for Breaking Strength and Elongation of Textile Webbing, Tape and Braided Material
 D6777 – 16 Test Method for Relative Rigidity of Poly(Vinyl Chloride)(PVC) Siding
 D6778 – 20 Classification System and Basis for Specification for Polyoxymethylene Molding and Extrusion Materials (POM)
 D6779 – 20 Classification System for and Basis of Specification for Polyamide Molding and Extrusion Materials (PA)
 D6780/D6780M – 19 Test Methods for Water Content and Density of Soil In situ by Time Domain Reflectometry (TDR)
 D6781 – 02(2014) Guide for Carbon Reactivation
 D6782 – 19 Test Methods for Standardization and Calibration of In-Line Dry Lumber Moisture Meters
 D6783 – 05a(2017) Specification for Polymer Concrete Pipe
 D6784 – 16 Test Method for Elemental, Oxidized, Particle-Bound and Total Mercury in Flue Gas Generated from Coal-Fired Stationary Sources (Ontario Hydro Method)
 D6785 – 20 Test Method for Determination of Lead in Workplace Air Using Flame or Graphite Furnace Atomic Absorption Spectrometry
 D6786 – 15 Test Method for Particle Count in Mineral Insulating Oil Using Automatic Optical Particle Counters
 D6787/D6787M – 02(2017) Specification for Repositionable Note Pad
 D6788 – 02(2017) Specification for Repositionable Pressure-Sensitive Flags
 D6790/D6790M – 16 Test Method for Determining Poisson's Ratio of Honeycomb Cores
 D6791 – 11(2017)e1 Test Method for Determination of Grain Stability of Calcined Petroleum Coke
 D6792 – 20 Practice for Quality Management Systems in Petroleum Products, Liquid Fuels, and Lubricants Testing Laboratories
 D6793 – 02(2012) Test Method for Determination of Isothermal Secant and Tangent Bulk Modulus
 D6794 – 20 Test Method for Measuring the Effect on Filterability of Engine Oils After Treatment with Various Amounts of Water and a Long (6 h) Heating Time
 D6795 – 19a Test Method for Measuring the Effect on Filterability of Engine Oils After Treatment with Water and Dry Ice and a Short (30 min) Heating Time
 D6796 – 16 Practice for Production of Coal, Coke and Coal Combustion Samples for Interlaboratory Studies
 D6797 – 15 Test Method for Bursting Strength of Fabrics Constant-Rate-of-Extension (CRE) Ball Burst Test
 D6798 – 02(2018) Terminology Relating to Flax and Linen
 D6799 – 13(2019) Terminology Relating to Inflatable Restraints
 D6800 – 18 Practice for Preparation of Water Samples Using Reductive Precipitation Preconcentration Technique for ICP-MS Analysis of Trace Metals

D6801-6900
 D6801 – 07(2015) Test Method for Measuring Maximum Spontaneous Heating Temperature of Art and Other Materials
 D6803 – 19 Practice for Testing and Sampling of Volatile Organic Compounds (Including Carbonyl Compounds) Emitted from Architectural Coatings Using Small-Scale Environmental Chambers
 D6804 – 19 Guide for Hand Hole Design in Corrugated Boxes
 D6805 – 02(2016) Practice for Infrared (IR) Procedure for Determination of Aromatic/ Aliphatic Ratio of Bituminous Emulsions
 D6806 – 02(2017) Practice for Analysis of Halogenated Organic Solvents and Their Admixtures by Gas Chromatography
 D6807 – 17 Test Method for Operating Performance of Continuous Electrodeionization Systems on Reverse Osmosis Permeates from2 to 100 μS/cm
 D6808 – 02(2018)e1 Practice for Competency Requirements of Reference Material Producers for Water Analysis
 D6809 – 20a Guide for Quality Control and Quality Assurance Procedures for Aromatic Hydrocarbons and Related Materials
 D6810 – 13 Test Method for Measurement of Hindered Phenolic Antioxidant Content in Non-Zinc Turbine Oils by Linear Sweep Voltammetry
 D6812 – 04a(2019) Practice for Ground-Based Octane Rating Procedures for Turbocharged/Supercharged Spark Ignition Aircraft Engines
 D6814 – 02(2018) Test Method for Determination of Percent Devulcanization of Crumb Rubber Based on Crosslink Density
 D6815 – 09(2015) Specification for Evaluation of Duration of Load and Creep Effects of Wood and Wood-Based Products
 D6816 – 11(2016) Practice for Determining Low-Temperature Performance Grade (PG) of Asphalt Binders
 D6817/D6817M – 17 Specification for Rigid Cellular Polystyrene Geofoam
 D6818 – 18a Test Method for Ultimate Tensile Properties of Rolled Erosion Control Products
 D6820 – 20 Guide for Use of the Time Domain Electromagnetic Method for Geophysical Subsurface Site Investigation
 D6821 – 20a Test Method for Low Temperature Viscosity of Drive Line Lubricants in a Constant Shear Stress Viscometer
 D6822 – 12b(2017) Test Method for Density, Relative Density, and API Gravity of Crude Petroleum and Liquid Petroleum Products by Thermohydrometer Method
 D6823 – 08(2013) Specification for Commercial Boiler Fuels With Used Lubricating Oils
 D6824 – 13(2018) Test Method for Determining Filterability of Aviation Turbine Fuel
 D6825 – 14e1 Guide for Placement of Riprap Revetments
 D6826 – 05(2014)e1 Specification for Sprayed Slurries, Foams and Indigenous Materials Used As Alternative Daily Cover for Municipal Solid Waste Landfills
 D6827 – 02(2016) Test Method for Zinc Analysis of Floor Polishes and Floor Polish Polymers By Flame Atomic Absorption (A.A.)
 D6828 – 02(2019) Test Method for Stiffness of Fabric by Blade/Slot Procedure
 D6829 – 02(2015) Tables of Body Measurements for Juniors, Sizes 0 to 19
 D6830 – 02(2016) Test Method for Characterizing the Pressure Drop and Filtration Performance of Cleanable Filter Media
 D6831 – 11(2018) Test Method for Sampling and Determining Particulate Matter in Stack Gases Using an In-Stack, Inertial Microbalance
 D6832 – 13(2018) Test Method for the Determination of Hexavalent Chromium in Workplace Air by Ion Chromatography and Spectrophotometric Measurement Using 1,5-diphenylcarbazide
 D6835 – 17 Classification System for Thermoplastic Elastomer-Ether-Ester Molding and Extrusion Materials (TEEE)
 D6836 – 16 Test Methods for Determination of the Soil Water Characteristic Curve for Desorption Using Hanging Column, Pressure Extractor, Chilled Mirror Hygrometer, or Centrifuge
 D6837 – 13 Test Method for Measurement of Effects of Automotive Engine Oils on Fuel Economy of Passenger Cars and Light-Duty Trucks in Sequence VIB Spark Ignition Engine
 D6839 – 18 Test Method for Hydrocarbon Types, Oxygenated Compounds, and Benzene in Spark Ignition Engine Fuels by Gas Chromatography
 D6840 – 02(2013) Test Method for Effect of Drycleaning on Buttons
 D6841 – 16 Practice for Calculating Design Value Treatment Adjustment Factors for Fire-Retardant-Treated Lumber
 D6843 – 10(2019) Test Method for Silanes Used in Rubber Formulations (bis-(triethoxysilylpropyl)sulfanes): Characterization by Gas Chromatography (GC)
 D6844 – 10(2019) Test Method for Silanes Used in Rubber Formulations (bis-(triethoxysilylpropyl)sulfanes): Characterization by High Performance Liquid Chromatography (HPLC)
 D6845 – 20 Test Method for Silica, Precipitated, Hydrated—CTAB (Cetyltrimethylammonium Bromide) Surface Area
 D6846 – 02(2020) Practice for Preparing Prints of Paste Printing Inks with a Printing Gage
 D6849 – 13 Practice for Storage and Use of Liquefied Petroleum Gases (LPG) in Sample Cylinders for LPG Test Methods
 D6850 – 18 Guide for QC of Screening Methods in Water
 D6851 – 20 Test Method for Determination of Contact pH with Activated Carbon
 D6855 – 17 Test Method for Determination of Turbidity Below 5 NTU in Static Mode
 D6856/D6856M – 03(2016) Guide for Testing Fabric-Reinforced “Textile” Composite Materials
 D6857/D6857M – 18 Test Method for Maximum Specific Gravity and Density of Asphalt Mixtures Using Automatic Vacuum Sealing Method
 D6859 – 18 Test Method for Pile Thickness of Finished Level Pile Yarn Floor Coverings
 D6860/D6860M – 19 Tables of Body Measurements for Boys, Sizes 4H to 20H Husky
 D6862 – 11(2016) Test Method for 90 Degree Peel Resistance of Adhesives
 D6865 – 17 Classification System and Basis for Specifications for Acrylonitrile–Styrene–Acrylate (ASA) and Acrylonitrile–EPDM–Styrene (AES) Plastics and Alloys Molding and Extrusion Materials
 D6866 – 20 Test Methods for Determining the Biobased Content of Solid, Liquid, and Gaseous Samples Using Radiocarbon Analysis
 D6867 – 19 Specification for Perfluoroalkoxy (PFA)-Fluoropolymer Tubing
 D6868 – 19 Specification for Labeling of End Items that Incorporate Plastics and Polymers as Coatings or Additives with Paper and Other Substrates Designed to be Aerobically Composted in Municipal or Industrial Facilities
 D6869 – 17 Test Method for Coulometric and Volumetric Determination of Moisture in Plastics Using the Karl Fischer Reaction (the Reaction of Iodine with Water)
 D6871 – 17 Specification for Natural (Vegetable Oil) Ester Fluids Used in Electrical Apparatus
 D6873/D6873M – 19 Practice for Bearing Fatigue Response of Polymer Matrix Composite Laminates
 D6874 – 20 Test Methods for Nondestructive Evaluation of the Stiffness of Wood and Wood-Based Materials Using Transverse Vibration or Stress Wave Propagation
 D6875 – 18 Test Method for Solidification Point of Industrial Organic Chemicals by Thermistor
 D6877 – 13(2018) Test Method for Monitoring Diesel Particulate Exhaust in the Workplace
 D6878/D6878M – 19 Specification for Thermoplastic Polyolefin Based Sheet Roofing
 D6880/D6880M – 19 Specification for Wood Boxes
 D6881/D6881M – 03(2020) Classification for Standard Plastics Industry Bulk Box/Pallet Unit Size Classified By Bulk Density
 D6883 – 17 Practice for Manual Sampling of Stationary Coal from Railroad Cars, Barges, Trucks, or Stockpiles
 D6884 – 03(2015)e1 Practice for Installation of Articulating Concrete Block (ACB) Revetment Systems
 D6886 – 18 Test Method for Determination of the Weight Percent Individual Volatile Organic Compounds in Waterborne Air-Dry Coatings by Gas Chromatography
 D6887 – 03(2020) Test Method for Testing Alkyd Compatibility with Resin or Resin Solutions
 D6888 – 16 Test Method for Available Cyanides with Ligand Displacement and Flow Injection Analysis (FIA) Utilizing Gas Diffusion Separation and Amperometric Detection
 D6889 – 03(2017) Practice for Fast Screening for Volatile Organic Compounds in Water Using Solid Phase Microextraction (SPME)
 D6890 – 18 Test Method for Determination of Ignition Delay and Derived Cetane Number (DCN) of Diesel Fuel Oils by Combustion in a Constant Volume Chamber
 D6891 – 15 Test Method for Evaluation of Automotive Engine Oils in the Sequence IVA Spark-Ignition Engine
 D6892 – 03(2020) Test Method for Pour Point of Petroleum Products (Robotic Tilt Method)
 D6894 – 13 Test Method for Evaluation of Aeration Resistance of Engine Oils in Direct-Injected Turbocharged Automotive Diesel Engine
 D6895 – 17 Test Method for Rotational Viscosity of Heavy Duty Diesel Drain Oils at 100 °C
 D6896 – 20a Test Method for Determination of Yield Stress and Apparent Viscosity of Used Engine Oils at Low Temperature
 D6897 – 16 Test Method for Vapor Pressure of Liquefied Petroleum Gases (LPG) (Expansion Method)
 D6898 – 03(2016) Test Method for Evaluating Diesel Fuel Lubricity by an Injection Pump Rig
 D6900 – 10(2020) Test Method for Wet Adhesion of Latex Paints to a Gloss Alkyd Enamel Substrate

D6901-7000
 D6901 – 15 Specification for Artists' Colored Pencils
 D6902 – 04(2017) Test Method for Laboratory Measurement of Formaldehyde Evolved During the Curing of Melamine-Formaldehyde-Based Coatings
 D6903 – 07(2020) Test Method for Determination of Organic Biocide Release Rate From Antifouling Coatings in Substitute Ocean Water
 D6904 – 03(2013) Practice for Resistance to Wind-Driven Rain for Exterior Coatings Applied on Masonry
 D6905 – 20 Practice for Impact Flexibility of Organic Coatings
 D6906 – 12a(2016) Test Method for Determination of Titanium Treatment Weight on Metal Substrates by Wavelength Dispersive X-Ray Fluorescence
 D6907 – 05(2016) Practice for Sampling Soils and Contaminated Media with Hand-Operated Bucket Augers
 D6908 – 06(2017) Practice for Integrity Testing of Water Filtration Membrane Systems
 D6909 – 10(2016) Specification for High Temperature and Acid-Resistant Fluorocarbon Terpolymer Elastomer
 D6910/D6910M – 19 Test Method for Marsh Funnel Viscosity of Construction Slurries
 D6911 – 15 Guide for Packaging and Shipping Environmental Samples for Laboratory Analysis
 D6913/D6913M – 17 Test Methods for Particle-Size Distribution (Gradation) of Soils Using Sieve Analysis
 D6914/D6914M – 16 Practice for Sonic Drilling for Site Characterization and the Installation of Subsurface Monitoring Devices
 D6915 – 17e1 Practice for Carbon Black—Evaluation of Standard Reference Blacks
 D6916 – 18 Test Method for Determining the Shear Strength Between Segmental Concrete Units (Modular Concrete Blocks)
 D6917 – 16 Guide for Selection of Test Methods for Prefabricated Vertical Drains (PVD)
 D6918 – 09(2014)e1 Test Method for Testing Vertical Strip Drains in the Crimped Condition
 D6919 – 17 Test Method for Determination of Dissolved Alkali and Alkaline Earth Cations and Ammonium in Water and Wastewater by Ion Chromatography
 D6922 – 13(2018) Test Method for Determination of Homogeneity and Miscibility in Automotive Engine Oils
 D6923 – 18 Test Method for Evaluation of Engine Oils in a High Speed, Single-Cylinder Diesel Engine—Caterpillar 1R Test Procedure
 D6924 – 03(2017) Specification for Preformed Thermoplastic Vulcanizate Elastomeric Joint Seals for Bridges
 D6925 – 15 Test Method for Preparation and Determination of the Relative Density of Asphalt Mix Specimens by Means of the Superpave Gyratory Compactor
 D6926 – 20 Practice for Preparation of Asphalt Mixture Specimens Using Marshall Apparatus
 D6927 – 15 Test Method for Marshall Stability and Flow of Asphalt Mixtures
 D6928 – 17 Test Method for Resistance of Coarse Aggregate to Degradation by Abrasion in the Micro-Deval Apparatus
 D6929 – 16 Practice to Evaluate the Effect of Freezing on Emulsified Asphalts
 D6930 – 19 Test Method for Settlement and Storage Stability of Emulsified Asphalts
 D6931 – 17 Test Method for Indirect Tensile (IDT) Strength of Asphalt Mixtures
 D6932/D6932M – 08(2013) Guide for Materials and Construction of Open-Graded Friction Course Plant Mixtures
 D6933 – 18 Test Method for Oversized Particles in Emulsified Asphalts (Sieve Test)
 D6934 – 08(2016) Test Method for Residue by Evaporation of Emulsified Asphalt
 D6935 – 17 Test Method for Determining Cement Mixing of Emulsified Asphalt
 D6936 – 17 Test Method for Determining Demulsibility of Emulsified Asphalt
 D6937 – 16 Test Method for Determining Density of Emulsified Asphalt
 D6938 – 17a Test Methods for In-Place Density and Water Content of Soil and Soil-Aggregate by Nuclear Methods (Shallow Depth)
 D6940/D6940M – 20 Practice for Measuring Sifting Segregation Tendencies of Bulk Solids
 D6941 – 19 Practice for Measuring Fluidization Segregation Tendencies of Powders
 D6942 – 03(2019) Test Method for Stability of Cellulose Fibers in Alkaline Environments
 D6943 – 15(2019) Practice for Immersion Testing of Industrial Protective Coatings and Linings
 D6944 – 15(2020) Practice for Determining the Resistance of Cured Coatings to Thermal Cycling
 D6945/D6945M – 03(2017) Specification for Emulsified Refined Coal-Tar (Ready to Use, Commercial Grade)
 D6946/D6946M – 13e1 Specification for Emulsified Refined Coal-Tar (Driveway Sealer, Ready to Use, Primarily Residential Grade)
 D6947/D6947M – 16 Specification for Liquid Applied Moisture Cured Polyurethane Coating Used in Spray Polyurethane Foam Roofing System
 D6948/D6948M – 03(2017) Practice for Application of Refined Coal Tar (Ready to Use, Commercial Grade)
 D6951/D6951M – 18 Test Method for Use of the Dynamic Cone Penetrometer in Shallow Pavement Applications
 D6953 – 18 Test Method for Determination of Antioxidants and Erucamide Slip Additives in Polyethylene Using Liquid Chromatography (LC)
 D6954 – 18 Guide for Exposing and Testing Plastics that Degrade in the Environment by a Combination of Oxidation and Biodegradation
 D6956 – 17 Guide for Demonstrating and Assessing Whether a Chemical Analytical Measurement System Provides Analytical Results Consistent with Their Intended Use
 D6957 – 12(2018) Practice for Measuring Curl in Paint Brush Filling Material
 D6958 – 20 Test Methods for Evaluating Side-Bonding Potential of Wood Coatings
 D6960/D6960M – 16e1 Tables for Body Measurements for Plus Women's Figure Type, Size Range 14W – 40W
 D6961/D6961M – 09(2015)e1 Test Method for Color Measurement of Flax Fiber
 D6962 – 20 Practice for Operation of a Roller Chair Tester for Pile Yarn Floor Coverings
 D6963 – 13 Terminology Relating to Sewn Products Automation
 D6966 – 18 Practice for Collection of Settled Dust Samples Using Wipe Sampling Methods for Subsequent Determination of Metals
 D6968 – 03(2015) Test Method for Simultaneous Measurement of Sulfur Compounds and Minor Hydrocarbons in Natural Gas and Gaseous Fuels by Gas Chromatography and Atomic Emission Detection
 D6969 – 17 Practice for Preparation of Calcined Petroleum Coke Samples for Analysis
 D6970 – 03(2019) Practice for Collection of Calcined Petroleum Coke Samples for Analysis
 D6971 – 09(2014) Test Method for Measurement of Hindered Phenolic and Aromatic Amine Antioxidant Content in Non-zinc Turbine Oils by Linear Sweep Voltammetry
 D6973 – 14(2019) Test Method for Indicating Wear Characteristics of Petroleum Hydraulic Fluids in a High Pressure Constant Volume Vane Pump
 D6974 – 20 Practice for Enumeration of Viable Bacteria and Fungi in Liquid Fuels—Filtration and Culture Procedures
 D6976 – 13(2018) Specification for Rubber Contraceptives—Vaginal Diaphragms
 D6977 – 19 Specification for Polychloroprene Examination Gloves for Medical Application
 D6978 – 05(2019) Practice for Assessment of Resistance of Medical Gloves to Permeation by Chemotherapy Drugs
 D6979 – 18 Test Method for Polyurethane Raw Materials: Determination of Basicity in Polyols, Expressed as Percent Nitrogen
 D6980 – 17 Test Method for Determination of Moisture in Plastics by Loss in Weight
 D6982 – 09(2016) Practice for Detecting Hot Spots Using Point-Net (Grid) Search Patterns
 D6984 – 18 Test Method for Evaluation of Automotive Engine Oils in the Sequence IIIF, Spark-Ignition Engine
 D6986 – 03(2020) Test Method for Free Water, Particulate and Other Contamination in Aviation Fuels (Visual Inspection Procedures)
 D6987/D6987M – 13a Test Method for Evaluation of Diesel Engine Oils in T-10 Exhaust Gas Recirculation Diesel Engine
 D6988 – 13 Guide for Determination of Thickness of Plastic Film Test Specimens
 D6989 – 03(2020) Practices for Preparation of Solvent and Water Based Ink Resin Solutions
 D6990 – 20 Practice for Evaluating Biofouling Resistance and Physical Performance of Marine Coating Systems
 D6991 – 17e1 Test Method for Measurements of Internal Stresses in Organic Coatings by Cantilever (Beam) Method
 D6992 – 16 Test Method for Accelerated Tensile Creep and Creep-Rupture of Geosynthetic Materials Based on Time-Temperature Superposition Using the Stepped Isothermal Method
 D6994 – 15 Test Method for Determination of Metal Cyanide Complexes in Wastewater, Surface Water, Groundwater and Drinking Water Using Anion Exchange Chromatography with UV Detection
 D6995 – 05(2013) Test Method for Determining Field VMA based on the Maximum Specific Gravity of the Mix (Gmm)
 D6997 – 12(2020) Test Method for Distillation of Emulsified Asphalt
 D6998 – 19 Practice for Evaluating Aggregate Coating using Emulsified Asphalts
 D6999 – 19 Practice for Miscibility of Emulsified Asphalts
 D7000 – 19a Test Method for Sweep Test of Emulsified Asphalt Surface Treatment Samples

See also
 International Classification for Standards
 List of ISO standards
 List of EN standards
 List of IEC standards

References

External links
ASTM Standards site 
List of D ASTM standards

 D6001
ASTM D6001
Materials testing
Pavement engineering